The Delaware and Hudson Railroad Passenger Station in Altamont, New York, which has also been known as Altamont Village Hall, is a structure that was built in 1887 by the Delaware and Hudson Railroad.  It was listed on the National Register of Historic Places in 1971.

It is a contributing property in the Altamont Historic District, an  historic district in Guilderland, New York. The station has been the headquarters of the Altamont Free Library since August 2012.

See also
National Register of Historic Places listings in Albany County, New York

References

Railway stations on the National Register of Historic Places in New York (state)
Transportation buildings and structures in Albany County, New York
Railway stations in the United States opened in 1887
National Register of Historic Places in Albany County, New York
Historic district contributing properties in New York (state)
Altamont
Former railway stations in New York (state)
Altamont, New York